Private John Roderick Towle (October 19, 1924 – September 21, 1944) was a United States Army soldier and a recipient of the United States military's highest decoration—the Medal of Honor—for his actions in World War II.

Military career
John Towle was born on October 19, 1924, the son of William Levi Towle and Mary Simkins. He had an older brother and two younger sisters. During World War II, Towle joined the United States Army in March 1943.,

He volunteered for the paratroopers, part of the U.S. Army's fledgling airborne forces, and was assigned to Company 'C' of the 1st Battalion, 504th Parachute Infantry Regiment (504th PIR), part of the 82nd "All American" Airborne Division, then commanded by Brigadier General James M. Gavin. On September 21, 1944, during Operation Market Garden, near hamlet Oosterhout (Overbetuwe) in the Netherlands during the operation, Towle engaged a German force with his rocket launcher in an attempt to disable two enemy tanks and a half-track. He was killed during the battle. He was posthumously awarded the Medal of Honor six months later, on March 15, 1945, making him the first member of the 82nd Airborne Division to be awarded the medal during World War II. 

Towle, aged 19 at his death, was buried at Calvary Cemetery in his hometown of Cleveland, Ohio.

Legacy
Private Towle's official Medal of Honor citation reads:
For conspicuous gallantry and intrepidity at the risk of life above and beyond the call of duty on 21 September 1944, near Oosterhout, Holland. The rifle company in which Pvt. Towle served as rocket launcher gunner was occupying a defensive position in the west sector of the recently established Nijmegen bridgehead when a strong enemy force of approximately 100 infantry supported by 2 tanks and a half-track formed for a counterattack. With full knowledge of the disastrous consequences resulting not only to his company but to the entire bridgehead by an enemy breakthrough, Pvt. Towle immediately and without orders left his foxhole and moved 200 yards in the face of intense small-arms fire to a position on an exposed dike roadbed. From this precarious position Pvt. Towle fired his rocket launcher at and hit both tanks to his immediate front. Armored skirting on both tanks prevented penetration by the projectiles, but both vehicles withdrew slightly damaged. Still under intense fire and fully exposed to the enemy, Pvt. Towle then engaged a nearby house which 9 Germans had entered and were using as a strongpoint and with 1 round killed all 9. Hurriedly replenishing his supply of ammunition, Pvt. Towle, motivated only by his high conception of duty which called for the destruction of the enemy at any cost, then rushed approximately 125 yards through grazing enemy fire to an exposed position from which he could engage the enemy half-track with his rocket launcher. While in a kneeling position preparatory to firing on the enemy vehicle, Pvt. Towle was mortally wounded by a mortar shell. By his heroic tenacity, at the price of his life, Pvt. Towle saved the lives of many of his comrades and was directly instrumental in breaking up the enemy counterattack.

The USNS Private John R. Towle (T-AK-240) was named in his honor.

Towle Fitness Center in Fort Bragg, North Carolina was named in his honor.

The citizens of Oosterhout marched in a parade in Private Towle's honor and renamed a street in the village after him on the morning of September 21, 2019, on the 75th anniversary of his heroism and their liberation.

See also

List of Medal of Honor recipients
List of Medal of Honor recipients for World War II

References

1924 births
1944 deaths
United States Army personnel killed in World War II
United States Army Medal of Honor recipients
Military personnel from Cleveland
United States Army soldiers
Burials in Calvary Cemetery (Cleveland)
World War II recipients of the Medal of Honor